The grey-rumped swallow (Pseudhirundo griseopyga) is a species of swallow. It is the only member of the genus Pseudhirundo.

It is found in Angola, Benin, Botswana, Burkina Faso, Burundi, Cameroon, Central African Republic, Republic of the Congo, Democratic Republic of the Congo, Ivory Coast, Equatorial Guinea, Eswatini, Ethiopia, Gabon, Gambia, Ghana, Guinea, Guinea-Bissau, Kenya, Liberia, Malawi, Mali, Mozambique, Namibia, Niger, Nigeria, Rwanda, Senegal, Sierra Leone, South Africa, Sudan, Tanzania, Uganda, Zambia, and Zimbabwe.

References

External links
 Grey-rumped swallow - Species text in The Atlas of Southern African Birds.

grey-rumped swallow
Birds of Sub-Saharan Africa
grey-rumped swallow
Taxonomy articles created by Polbot